The title Hub of the Universe is claimed by several North American cities:

 Grayslake, Illinois
 Boston, Massachusetts
 Goldsboro, Maryland
 Boswell, Indiana
 Copetown, Ontario

See also 
 Bushkill, Pennsylvania
 List of places referred to as the Center of the Universe

References 

Hub of the Universe